Məzrə or Mazra or Mezre may refer to:

 Məzrə, Babek, Azerbaijan
 Məzrə, Jabrayil, Azerbaijan
 Məzrə, Ordubad, Azerbaijan
 Məzrə, Qubadli, Azerbaijan
 Yuxarı Məzrə, Jabrayil, Azerbaijan